The Department of Labour and National Service was an Australian government department that existed between October 1940 and December 1972.

Scope
Information about the department's functions and/or government funding allocation could be found in the Administrative Arrangements Orders, the annual Portfolio Budget Statements and in the Department's annual reports.

At its creation, the Department's functions were general labour policy, manpower priorities, investigations of labour supply and labour demand, the effective placement of labour, technical training, industrial relations and industrial welfare, and planning for post-war rehabilitation and development.

Structure
The Department was a Commonwealth Public Service department, staffed by officials who were responsible to the Minister for Labour and National Service.

Sir Roland Wilson was seconded to establish the new Department of Labour and National Service in 1940, and at 36 years old became its first administrative head.

References

Ministries established in 1940
Labour and National Service